Evogliptin (INN; trade names Suganon, Evodine) is an antidiabetic drug in the dipeptidyl peptidase-4 (DPP-4) inhibitor or "gliptin" class of drugs. It was developed by the South Korean pharmaceutical company Dong-A ST and is approved for use in South Korea and Russia. In a meta-analysis involving data from 6 randomized controlled trials (887 patients), Dutta et. al. demonstrated the good glycaemic efficacy and safety of this medicine as compared to other DPP4 inhibitors like sitagliptin and linagliptin.

References 

Dipeptidyl peptidase-4 inhibitors
Fluoroarenes
Piperazines
Tert-butyl compounds